Mount Agung is an active volcano in Bali, Indonesia, southeast of Mount Batur volcano, also in Bali. It is the highest point on Bali, and dominates the surrounding area, influencing the climate, especially rainfall patterns. From a distance, the mountain appears to be perfectly conical. From the peak of the mountain, it is possible to see the peak of Mount Rinjani on the nearby island of Lombok, to the east, although both mountains are frequently covered in clouds. Agung is a stratovolcano, with a large and deep crater. Its most recent eruptions occurred from 2017–2019.

History of eruptions

1843 eruption 

Agung erupted in 1843, as recorded in a report by Heinrich Zollinger:

1963–64 eruption 
The eruption of 1963 was one of the largest and most devastating eruptions in Indonesia's history.

On February 18, 1963, local residents heard loud explosions and saw clouds rising from the crater of Mount Agung. On February 24, lava began flowing down the northern slope of the mountain, eventually traveling 7 km in the next 20 days. On March 17, the volcano erupted (VEI 5), sending debris 8 to 10 km into the air and generating massive pyroclastic flows.
These flows devastated numerous villages, killing an estimated 1,100–1,500 people. Cold lahars caused by heavy rainfall after the eruption killed an additional 200. A second eruption on May 16 led to pyroclastic flows that killed another 200 inhabitants. Minor eruptions and flows followed and lasted almost a year.

The lava flows missed, sometimes by mere metres, the Mother Temple of Besakih. The saving of the temple is regarded by Balinese as miraculous and a signal from the gods that they wished to demonstrate their power but not destroy the monument that the Balinese had erected.

Andesite was the dominant lava type with some samples mafic enough to be classified as basaltic andesite. The eruption had global effects on temperatures.

2017-2019 seismic activity and eruption 

In November 2017, the area experienced 844 volcanic earthquakes, peaking at 300 to 400 earthquakes on 26 September. The frequency and intensity of these quakes caused much alarm among seismologists, as similar volcanoes have historically been known to erupt with even fewer warning signs. The alert level was raised to the highest level and about 122,500 people were evacuated from their houses around the volcano. The Indonesian National Disaster Management Authority declared a 12-kilometre exclusion zone around the volcano on 24 September.

Evacuees gathered in sports halls and other community buildings around Klungkung, Karangasem, Buleleng, and other areas. By late October 2017, the activity of the volcano decreased significantly, leading to lowering of the highest status of emergency on 29 October.

On 21 November, activity increased once again. Thousands of people immediately fled the area, and over 29,000 temporary refugees were reported to be housed in over 270 locations nearby. Early on Saturday 25 November a magmatic eruption 
began. The resulting eruption plume was reported to rise about 1.5–4 km above the summit crater, drifting towards the south and dusting the surroundings with thin layer of dark ash, leading some airlines to cancel flights bound for Australia and New Zealand. An orange glow was later observed around the crater at night, suggesting that fresh magma had indeed reached the surface. On 26 November 2017, another eruption occurred, the second in less than a week. Ngurah Rai International Airport was closed 26 November 2017, leaving many tourists stranded. Lahars were reported in the Selat district south of the volcano. More than 100,000 people in a  radius of the volcano were ordered to evacuate.

Australia's Bureau of Meteorology reported on 27 November that ash from the eruption had been observed at an altitude of 9,144 m. By the beginning of December, the eruption reduced to minor emissions of steam and smoke. On 12 December, a picture of the crater was taken showing a steadily growing lava dome occupying approximately one third of the crater.

In June 2018, Agung erupted with 2 km high plumes interrupting air traffic. On 3 July, a Strombolian explosion occurred, sending debris in all directions. In late May 2019 an eruption spewed lava and rocks over about 3 km, with some ash fall on nearby villages and temporarily interrupting international flights.

Religious beliefs
Balinese people believe that Mt Agung is a replica of Mt Meru, the central axis of the universe. The most important temple on Bali, Pura Besakih, is high on the slopes of Gunung Agung.

See also 

 List of Southeast Asian mountains
 List of Ultras of Malay Archipelago
 List of volcanic eruptions by death toll
 List of volcanoes in Indonesia
 Pura Besakih, a temple complex on Mount Agung

Notes

References

External links 

 
 Agung on Volcano World
 
 "Gunung Agung, Indonesia" on Peakbagger
 A 5000-year record of multiple highly explosive mafic eruptions from Gunung Agung (Bali, Indonesia): implications for eruption frequency and volcanic hazards

Sacred mountains
Stratovolcanoes of Indonesia
Volcanoes of Bali
VEI-5 volcanoes
Active volcanoes of Indonesia
20th-century volcanic events
21st-century volcanic events
Karangasem Regency
Mountains of Bali
Holocene stratovolcanoes